Hamilton railway station serves the city of Hamilton in the Waikato region of New Zealand. It is located in the suburb of Frankton, hence the station's former name Frankton Junction, its name for most of its existence. The station is a Keilbahnhof, located at the junction of the North Island Main Trunk (NIMT) and East Coast Main Trunk (ECMT) lines. The station is served by the regional Te Huia service, which runs to Auckland via Rotokauri Transport Hub and Huntly railway station twice daily in the morning, with return services in the evening.

The station was served by the Northern Explorer scheduled passenger service until it was suspended in December 2021 and will be again when said train resumes running in September 2022.

History
Frankton Junction station consisted of an island platform located on the NIMT just north of the junction between the ECMT and NIMT. It had two signal boxes, and a locomotive depot was located in the Vee of the junction. In 1909 a new, larger station was built to cope with the extra traffic of the through line to Wellington,  to the north. The first Auckland - Wellington through expresses ran on 14 February 1909, taking 19 hours 13 minutes, and stopping at Frankton.

Due to the end of steam operation in the North Island in 1968, the depot was closed and a new station was opened on its site in 1975 with a side platform on each line. The station was renamed to its present name at that time. The listed Frankton South End signal box was relocated to the Hamilton Miniature Engineers' site at Minogue Park, opposite the new Te Rapa loco depot.

The station was important in the growth of Hamilton and historically the trains calling included The Overlander, Blue Streak, Scenic Daylight, Daylight Limited, Northerner, Northern Explorer, Silver Star, Night Limited, Waikato Connection, Rotorua Express, Geyserland Express, Thames Express, Taneatua Express and Kaimai Express.

The scale of past use of the station is indicated by a 1936 report that 3 months' revenue was £7065 for tickets (27,025 sold), £1482 for parcels and £24,143 for goods, including 43,357 sheep, 5,849 cattle and 1,756,450 feet of timber. The 2016 equivalent would be about $15m a year.

Traffic grew steadily, as shown in the graph and table below.

Services
In 2009, the canopy over platform 1 (NIMT) was reduced in length. The ECMT carries no passenger services and its platform (platform 2) is used infrequently by excursion trains.

The station is currently served by the Te Huia service to Auckland Strand station using refurbished SA and SD coaches.

Previous services include the Kaimai Express and Geyserland Express railcars to Tauranga and Rotorua (Koutu) respectively, which were cancelled in 2002, and the overnight Northerner, which ceased operation in 2004 under Toll Rail. The Northern Explorer stopped at the station until 2021 as did The Overlander until 2012.

The Waikato Connection commuter service to Auckland ran in 2000 and 2001.

References

External links
1:50,000 map
Hamilton station on Google Street View
1890s photo of station and staff
Hamilton Libraries photos of station and 1880-1970s
1915 view of railway yards and station
1927 photos of refreshment rooms
Te Ara Encyclopedia – photo of a crowded platform in the 1930s
NZ Railways Magazine 1 December 1934 – Frankton yesterday and today
NZ Railways Magazine 1 June 1937 bus advert showing bus connections from station yard
Hamilton Libraries – refreshment room breakfast menu
1952 photo of signal box and station
1975 photo of part of Frankton Junction
1982 photo of station and level crossing

Railway stations in New Zealand
Buildings and structures in Hamilton, New Zealand
Railway stations opened in 1975
Rail transport in Waikato